Hans Simon (born 25 January 1947) is a German water polo player. He competed at the 1972 Summer Olympics and the 1976 Summer Olympics.

References

External links
 

1947 births
Living people
German male water polo players
Olympic water polo players of West Germany
Water polo players at the 1972 Summer Olympics
Water polo players at the 1976 Summer Olympics
People from Lünen
Sportspeople from Arnsberg (region)